Atractus albuquerquei, commonly known as the Albuquerque ground snake, is a species of small burrowing snake in the family Colubridae. The species is endemic to South America.

Etymology
The specific name, albuquerquei, is in honor of Brazilian entomologist Dalcy de Oliveira Albuquerque (1902–1982).

Habitat

Geographic range
A. albuquerque is found in the Brazilian states of Acre, Goias, Mato Grosso, Mato Grosso do Sul, Pará, and Rondônia, and in Bolivia.

Description
A. albuquerquei is dark  brown  to  black dorsally, and cream or yellow ventrally. It has smooth dorsal scales.

Reproduction
A. albuquerquei is oviparous.

References

Further reading
da Cunha OR, do Nascimento FP (1983). "Ofidios da Amazonia 20 - As especies de Atractus Wagler, 1828, na Amazonia oriental & Maranhao (Ophidia, Colubridae) ". Boletim do Museu Paraense Emilio Goeldi Nova Serie Zoologia (123): 1-38. (Atractus albuquerquei, new species). (in Portuguese).
Zaher H, Souza I, Gower DJ, Hingst-Zaher E, da Silva NJ Jr (2005). "Redescription of Atractus albuquerquei (Serpentes: Colubridae: Dipsadinae), with comments on geographical distribution and intraspecific variation". Papéis Avulsos de Zoologia, Museu de Zoologia da Universidade de São Paulo 45 (2): 19–32.

Atractus
Snakes of South America
Reptiles of Bolivia
Reptiles of Brazil
Reptiles described in 1983